Patrick Rea (born January 3, 1980, in Schuyler, Nebraska) is an American producer, writer and director.

Biography
Rea graduated in December 2002 from the University of Kansas with a degree in film studies and a minor in communications.

Movie career
Rea began creating short films in 2002. He collaborated with Ryan Jones and Josh Robison to found the company SenoReality Pictures, which was a winner in Fangoria's Blood Drive contest. He continued to direct short films, some of which have screened at festivals such as Shriekfest LA and have shown on FangoriaTV, Horror Channel and n8studios.com.

His first full-length film, The Empty Acre, was completed in 2006 and premiered at the Kansas International Film Festival. The DVD was released and nationally distributed in summer 2007.  Rea went on to co-direct the 2010 Showtime special Jake Johannsen: I Love You and in 2012, directed the featurette Rhino. The following year he released the indie horror flick Nailbiter and in 2020, released I Am Lisa.

References

External links 
 
 SenoReality Pictures
 Free State Studios

Living people
1980 births
American male screenwriters
American male actors
American cinematographers
American film producers
University of Kansas alumni
People from Schuyler, Nebraska
Film directors from Nebraska
Screenwriters from Nebraska